Mukhtar al-Bakri (born 1981) is a Yemeni-American who grew up in the suburbs of Buffalo, New York. In 2002, he was arrested and charged as part of the War on Terror together with the other members of the "Lackawanna Six", based on the fact the group of friends had attended an Afghan training camp together years earlier.

Like the others, although initially entering a plea of "not guilty", he eventually pleaded guilty to "providing material support or resources to a foreign terrorist organization". He was convicted and sentenced to 10 years in prison and a $2,000 fine.

Life
Mukhtar was born in 1981, along with a twin brother named Amin, to Ali al-Bakri, a Yemeni who had immigrated to the United States decades earlier, and had spent the past 25 years working in the Sorrento Cheese Factory in New York. Ali and his wife, their twin sons, and their eldest son, his wife and children all lived together in a 2-storey house on Ingham Avenue.

Arrest
American counter-terrorism officials grew increasingly worried that al-Bakri's conversations kept mentioning a date in the future as the date of his "wedding" and the planning of a "big meal", so when he flew to Bahrain they arranged for a commando team to storm his hotel room on 9 September 2002. They were surprised to find al-Bakri in bed with his new wife, preparing to consummate their marriage - and quickly handcuffed him and hustled him out of the room as she cried.

He was held by Bahrain for five days, until State Trooper Mike Urbanski was able to fly out to the kingdom to pick up al-Bakri. After being interrogated and sharing his life story with Urbanski for five hours, al-Bakri had just one question he asked in return; how the Buffalo Bills football team was doing. He admitted in court that in April 2001, he and other members participated in a military-type training in Afghanistan.

He was sentenced to 10 years in prison and $2,000 fine on a charge of providing material support to the Al Qaeda in December 2003.

References

American people imprisoned on charges of terrorism
Buffalo Six
Living people
American twins
American people of Yemeni descent
1981 births
People from Lackawanna, New York